Xi Jinping (born 15 June 1953) is a Chinese politician who has served as the general secretary of the Chinese Communist Party (CCP) and chairman of the Central Military Commission (CMC), and thus as the paramount leader of China, since 2012. Xi has also served as the president of the People's Republic of China (PRC) since 2013.

The son of Chinese Communist veteran Xi Zhongxun, Xi was exiled to rural Yanchuan County as a teenager following his father's purge during the Cultural Revolution. He lived in a yaodong in the village of Liangjiahe, Shaanxi province, where he joined the CCP after several failed attempts and worked as the local party secretary. After studying chemical engineering at Tsinghua University as a worker-peasant-soldier student, Xi rose through the ranks politically in China's coastal provinces. Xi was governor of Fujian from 1999 to 2002, before becoming governor and party secretary of neighboring Zhejiang from 2002 to 2007. Following the dismissal of the party secretary of Shanghai, Chen Liangyu, Xi was transferred to replace him for a brief period in 2007. He subsequently joined the Politburo Standing Committee (PSC) of the CCP the same year and served as first secretary of the Central Secretariat in October 2007. In 2008, he was designated as Hu Jintao's presumed successor as paramount leader; to that end, Xi was appointed vice president of the PRC and vice chairman of the CMC. He officially received the title of leadership core from the CCP in 2016.

Xi is the first CCP general secretary born after the establishment of the PRC. Since assuming power, Xi has introduced far-ranging measures to enforce party discipline and to impose internal unity. His anti-corruption campaign led to the downfall of prominent incumbent and retired CCP officials, including Zhou Yongkang, a former member of the PSC. He has also enacted or promoted a more aggressive foreign policy, particularly with regard to China's relations with the U.S., the nine-dash line in the South China Sea, the Sino-Indian border dispute, and the political status of Taiwan. He has sought to expand China's African and Eurasian influence through the Belt and Road Initiative. Xi has expanded support for state-owned enterprises (SOEs), advanced military-civil fusion, overseen targeted poverty alleviation programs, and has attempted to reform the property sector. He has also promoted "common prosperity", a series of policies designed with stated goal to increase equality, and used the term to justify a broad crackdown and major slew of regulations against the tech and tutoring sectors in 2021.

Xi met with Taiwanese president Ma Ying-jeou in 2015, the first time PRC and Republic of China leaders met, though relations deteriorated after Tsai Ing-wen of the Democratic Progressive Party (DPP) won the presidential elections in 2016. He responded to the COVID-19 pandemic in mainland China with a zero-COVID approach until December 2022, afterwards shifting towards a mitigation strategy. Xi also oversaw the passage of a national security law in Hong Kong, clamping down on political opposition in the city, especially pro-democracy activists.

Often described as an authoritarian leader by political and academic observers, Xi's tenure has included an increase of censorship and mass surveillance, deterioration in human rights, including the internment of one million Uyghurs in Xinjiang (which some observers have described as part of a genocide), a cult of personality developing around Xi, and the removal of term limits for the presidency in 2018. Xi's political ideas and principles, known as Xi Jinping Thought, have been incorporated into the party and national constitutions, and he has emphasized the importance of national security and the need for CCP leadership over the country. As the central figure of the fifth generation of leadership of the PRC, Xi has centralized institutional power by taking on multiple positions, including chairing the National Security Commission and new steering committees on economic and social reforms, military restructuring and modernization, and the Internet. He and the CCP Central Committee passed a "historical resolution" in November 2021, the third such resolution after Mao Zedong and Deng Xiaoping. In October 2022, Xi secured a third term as CCP General Secretary, the second leader of the CCP to do so (the other being Mao).

Early life and education
Xi Jinping was born in Beijing on 15 June 1953, the second son of Xi Zhongxun and his wife Qi Xin. After the founding of the PRC in 1949, Xi's father held a series of posts, including Party propaganda chief, vice-premier, and vice chairperson of the National People's Congress. Xi had two older sisters, Qiaoqiao, born in 1949 and An'an, born in 1952. Xi's father was from Fuping County, Shaanxi, and Xi could further trace his patrilineal descent from Xiying in Dengzhou, Henan.

Xi went to the Beijing No. 25 School, and then Beijing Bayi School, in the 1960s. He became friends with Liu He, who attended Beijing No. 101 School in the same district, who later became China's vice-premier and a close advisor to Xi after he became China's paramount leader. In 1963, when he was aged 10, his father was purged from the CCP and sent to work in a factory in Luoyang, Henan. In May 1966, the Cultural Revolution cut short Xi's secondary education when all secondary classes were halted for students to criticise and fight their teachers. Student militants ransacked the Xi family home and one of Xi's sisters, Xi Heping, committed suicide from the pressure.

Later, his mother was forced to publicly denounce his father, as he was paraded before a crowd as an enemy of the revolution. His father was later imprisoned in 1968 when Xi was aged 15. Without the protection of his father, Xi was sent to work in Liangjiahe Village, Wen'anyi, Yanchuan County, Yan'an, Shaanxi, in 1969 in Mao Zedong's Down to the Countryside Movement. He worked as the party secretary of Liangjiahe, where he lived in a cave house. According to people who knew him, this experience led him to feel affinity with the rural poor. After a few months, unable to stand rural life, he ran away to Beijing. He was arrested during a crackdown on deserters from the countryside and sent to a work camp to dig ditches, but later returned to the village, spending a total of seven years there.

The misfortunes and suffering of his family in his early years hardened Xi's view of politics. During an interview in 2000, he said, "People who have little contact with power, who are far from it, always see these things as mysterious and novel. But what I see is not just the superficial things: the power, the flowers, the glory, the applause. I see the bullpens and how people can blow hot and cold. I understand politics on a deeper level." The "bullpens" (牛棚) was a reference to Red Guards' detention houses during the Cultural Revolution.

After being rejected seven times, Xi joined the Communist Youth League of China in 1971 by befriending a local official. He reunited with his father in 1972, because of a family reunion ordered by premier Zhou Enlai. From 1973, he applied to join the CCP ten times and was finally accepted on his tenth attempt in 1974. From 1975 to 1979, Xi studied chemical engineering at Tsinghua University as a worker-peasant-soldier student in Beijing. The engineering majors there spent about 15 percent of their time studying Marxism–Leninism–Mao Zedong thought and 5 percent of their time doing farm work and "learning from the People's Liberation Army".

Rise to power
From 1979 to 1982, Xi served as secretary for his father's former subordinate Geng Biao, the then vice premier and secretary-general of the CMC. In 1982, he was sent to Zhengding County in Hebei as deputy party secretary of Zhengding County. He was promoted in 1983 to secretary, becoming the top official of the county. Xi subsequently served in four provinces during his regional political career: Hebei (1982–1985), Fujian (1985–2002), Zhejiang (2002–2007), and Shanghai (2007). Xi held posts in the Fuzhou Municipal Party Committee and became the president of the Party School in Fuzhou in 1990. In 1997, he was named an alternate member of the 15th Central Committee of the CCP. However, of the 151 alternate members of the Central Committee elected at the 15th Party Congress, Xi received the lowest number of votes in favour, placing him last in the rankings of members, ostensibly due to his status as a princeling.

From 1998 to 2002, Xi studied Marxist theory and ideological education in Tsinghua University, graduating with a doctorate in law and ideology in 2002. In 1999, he was promoted to the office of Vice Governor of Fujian, and became governor a year later. In Fujian, Xi made efforts to attract investment from Taiwan and to strengthen the private sector of the provincial economy. In February 2000, he and then-provincial party secretary Chen Mingyi were called before the top members of PSC – general secretary Jiang Zemin, premier Zhu Rongji, vice president Hu Jintao and Discipline Inspection secretary Wei Jianxing – to explain aspects of the Yuanhua scandal.

In 2002, Xi left Fujian and took up leading political positions in neighbouring Zhejiang. He eventually took over as provincial Party Committee secretary after several months as acting governor, occupying a top provincial office for the first time in his career. In 2002, he was elected a full member of the 16th Central Committee, marking his ascension to the national stage. While in Zhejiang, Xi presided over reported growth rates averaging 14% per year. His career in Zhejiang was marked by a tough and straightforward stance against corrupt officials. This earned him a name in the national media and drew the attention of China's top leaders.

Following the dismissal of Shanghai Party secretary Chen Liangyu in September 2006 due to a social security fund scandal, Xi was transferred to Shanghai in March 2007, where he was the party secretary there for seven months. In Shanghai, Xi avoided controversy and was known for strictly observing party discipline. For example, Shanghai administrators attempted to earn favour with him by arranging a special train to shuttle him between Shanghai and Hangzhou for him to complete handing off his work to his successor as Zhejiang party secretary Zhao Hongzhu. However, Xi reportedly refused to take the train, citing a loosely enforced party regulation that stipulated that special trains can only be reserved for "national leaders". While in Shanghai, he worked on preserving unity of the local party organisation. He pledged there would be no 'purges' during his administration, despite the fact many local officials were thought to have been implicated in the Chen Liangyu corruption scandal. On most issues, Xi largely echoed the line of the central leadership.

Politburo Standing Committee member

Xi was appointed to the nine-man PSC at the 17th Party Congress in October 2007. He was ranked above Li Keqiang, an indication that he was going to succeed Hu Jintao as China's next leader. In addition, Xi also held the first secretary of the CCP's Central Secretariat. This assessment was further supported at the 11th National People's Congress in March 2008, when Xi was elected as vice president of the PRC. Following his elevation, Xi held a broad range of portfolios. He was put in charge of the comprehensive preparations for the 2008 Summer Olympics in Beijing, as well as being the central government's leading figure in Hong Kong and Macau affairs. In addition, he also became the new president of the Central Party School of the CCP, its cadre-training and ideological education wing. In the wake of the 2008 Sichuan earthquake, Xi visited disaster areas in Shaanxi and Gansu. He made his first foreign trip as vice president to North Korea, Mongolia, Saudi Arabia, Qatar and Yemen from 17 to 25 June 2008. After the Olympics, Xi was assigned the post of committee chair for the preparations of the 60th Anniversary Celebrations of the founding of the PRC. He was also reportedly at the helm of a top-level CCP committee dubbed the 6521 Project, which was charged with ensuring social stability during a series of politically sensitive anniversaries in 2009.

Xi's position as the apparent successor to become the paramount leader was threatened with the rapid rise of Bo Xilai, the party secretary of Chongqing at the time. Bo was expected to join the PSC at the 18th Party Congress, with most expecting that he would try to eventually maneuver himself into replacing Xi. Bo's policies in Chongqing inspired imitations throughout China and received praise from Xi himself during Xi's visit to Chongqing in 2010. Records of praises from Xi were later erased after he became paramount leader. Bo's downfall would come with the Wang Lijun incident, which opened the door for Xi to come to power without challengers.

Xi is considered one of the most successful members of the Princelings, a quasi-clique of politicians who are descendants of early Chinese Communist revolutionaries. Former prime minister of Singapore, Lee Kuan Yew, when asked about Xi, said he felt he was "a thoughtful man who has gone through many trials and tribulations". Lee also commented: "I would put him in the Nelson Mandela class of persons. A person with enormous emotional stability who does not allow his personal misfortunes or sufferings affect his judgment. In other words, he is impressive". Former U.S. Treasury Secretary Henry Paulson described Xi as "the kind of guy who knows how to get things over the goal line". Australian prime minister Kevin Rudd said that Xi "has sufficient reformist, party and military background to be very much his own man".

Trips as Vice President
In February 2009, in his capacity as vice-president, Xi Jinping embarked on a tour of Latin America, visiting Mexico, Jamaica, Colombia, Venezuela, Brazil, and Malta, after which he returned to China. On 11 February 2009, while visiting Mexico, Xi spoke in front of a group of overseas Chinese and explained China's contributions during the international financial crisis, saying that it was "the greatest contribution towards the whole of human race, made by China, to prevent its 1.3 billion people from hunger". He went on to remark: "There are some bored foreigners, with full stomachs, who have nothing better to do than point fingers at us. First, China doesn't export revolution; second, China doesn't export hunger and poverty; third, China doesn't come and cause you headaches.  What more is there to be said?" The story was reported on some local television stations. The news led to a flood of discussions on Chinese Internet forums and it was reported that the Chinese Ministry of Foreign Affairs was caught off-guard by Xi's remarks, as the actual video was shot by some accompanying Hong Kong reporters and broadcast on Hong Kong TV, which then turned up on various Internet video websites.

In the European Union, Xi visited Belgium, Germany, Bulgaria, Hungary and Romania from 7 to 21 October 2009. He visited Japan, South Korea, Cambodia, and Myanmar on his Asian trip from 14 to 22 December 2009. He later visited the United States, Ireland and Turkey in February 2012. This visit included meeting with then U.S. president Barack Obama at the White House and then vice president Joe Biden; and stops in California and Iowa, where he met with the family that previously hosted him during his 1985 tour as a Hebei provincial official.

Leadership

Accession to top posts

A few months before his ascendancy to the party leadership, Xi disappeared from official media coverage and cancelled meeting with foreign officials for several weeks beginning on 1 September 2012, causing rumors. He then reappeared on 15 September. On 15 November 2012, Xi was elected to the posts of general secretary of the CCP and chairman of the CMC by the 18th Central Committee of the CCP. This made him, informally, the paramount leader and the first to be born after the founding of the PRC. The following day Xi led the new line-up of the PSC  onto the stage in their first public appearance. The PSC was reduced from nine to seven, with only Xi and Li Keqiang retaining their seats; the other five members were new. In a marked departure from the common practice of Chinese leaders, Xi's first speech as general secretary was plainly worded and did not include any political slogans or mention his predecessors. Xi mentioned the aspirations of the average person, remarking, "Our people ... expect better education, more stable jobs, better income, more reliable social security, medical care of a higher standard, more comfortable living conditions, and a more beautiful environment." Xi also vowed to tackle corruption at the highest levels, alluding that it would threaten the CCP's survival; he was reticent about far-reaching economic reforms.

In December 2012, Xi visited Guangdong in his first trip outside Beijing since taking the Party leadership. The overarching theme of the trip was to call for further economic reform and a strengthened military. Xi visited the statue of Deng Xiaoping and his trip was described as following in the footsteps of Deng's own southern trip in 1992, which provided the impetus for further economic reforms in China after conservative party leaders stalled many of Deng's reforms in the aftermath of the 1989 Tiananmen Square protests and massacre. On his trip, Xi consistently alluded to his signature slogan the "Chinese Dream". "This dream can be said to be the dream of a strong nation. And for the military, it is a dream of a strong military", Xi told sailors. Xi's trip was significant in that he departed from the established convention of Chinese leaders' travel routines in multiple ways. Rather than dining out, Xi and his entourage ate regular hotel buffet. He travelled in a large van with his colleagues rather than a fleet of limousines, and did not restrict traffic on the parts of the highway he travelled.

Xi was elected president on 14 March 2013, in a confirmation vote by the 12th National People's Congress in Beijing. He received 2,952 for, one vote against, and three abstentions. He replaced Hu Jintao, who retired after serving two terms. In his new capacity as president, on 16 March 2013 Xi expressed support for non-interference in China–Sri Lanka relations amid a United Nations Security Council vote to condemn that country over government abuses during the Sri Lankan Civil War. On 17 March, Xi and his new ministers arranged a meeting with the chief executive of Hong Kong, CY Leung, confirming his support for Leung. Within hours of his election, Xi discussed cyber security and North Korea with U.S. President Barack Obama over the phone. Obama announced the visits of treasury and state secretaries Jacob Lew and John F. Kerry to China the following week.

Anti-corruption campaign

Xi vowed to crack down on corruption almost immediately after he ascended to power at the 18th Party Congress. In his inaugural speech as general secretary, Xi mentioned that fighting corruption was one of the toughest challenges for the party. A few months into his term, Xi outlined the Eight-point Regulation, listing rules intended to curb corruption and waste during official party business; it aimed at stricter discipline on the conduct of party officials. Xi also vowed to root out "tigers and flies", that is, high-ranking officials and ordinary party functionaries.

Xi initiated cases against former CMC vice-chairmen Xu Caihou and Guo Boxiong, former PSC member and security chief Zhou Yongkang and former Hu Jintao chief aide Ling Jihua. Along with new disciplinary chief Wang Qishan, Xi's administration spearheaded the formation of "centrally-dispatched inspection teams". These were essentially cross-jurisdictional squads of officials whose main task was to gain more in-depth understanding of the operations of provincial and local party organizations, and in the process, also enforce party discipline mandated by Beijing. Many of the work teams also had the effect of identifying and initiating investigations of high-ranking officials. Over one hundred provincial-ministerial level officials were implicated during a massive nationwide anti-corruption campaign. These included former and current regional officials (Su Rong, Bai Enpei, Wan Qingliang), leading figures of state-owned enterprises and central government organs (Song Lin, Liu Tienan), and highly ranked generals in the military (Gu Junshan). In June 2014, the Shanxi provincial political establishment was decimated, with four officials dismissed within a week from the provincial party organization's top ranks. Within the first two years of the campaign alone, over 200,000 low-ranking officials received warnings, fines, and demotions.

The campaign has led to the downfall of prominent incumbent and retired CCP officials, including members of the PSC. Xi's anti-corruption campaign is seen by critics, such as The Economist, as a political tool with the aim of removing potential opponents and consolidating power. Xi's establishment of a new anti-corruption agency, the National Supervision Commission, ranked higher than the supreme court, has been described by Amnesty International's East Asia director as a "systemic threat to human rights" that "places tens of millions of people at the mercy of a secretive and virtually unaccountable system that is above the law."

Xi has overseen significant reforms of the Central Commission for Discipline Inspection (CCDI), CCP's highest internal control institution. He and CCDI Secretary Wang Qishan further institutionalized CCDI's independence from the day-to-day operations of the CCP, improving its ability to function as a bona fide control body. According to The Wall Street Journal, any anti-corruption punishment to officials at or above the vice ministerial level need approval from Xi. Another article from The Wall Street Journal said that when he wants to neutralize a political rival, he asks inspectors to prepare hundreds of pages of evidence. The article also said that he sometimes authorizes investigations on close associates of a high-ranking politician to replace them with his own proteges and puts political rivals in less important positions to separate them from their political bases. Reportedly, these tactics have even been used against Wang Qishan, Xi's close friend.

According to historian and sinologist Wang Gungwu, Xi Jinping inherited a political party that was faced with pervasive corruption. Xi believed that the amount of corruption at the higher levels of the CCP put both the party and the country at risk of collapse. Wang further adds that Xi has a belief that only the CCP is capable of governing China, and that a collapse of the party would be disastrous for the Chinese people. Xi and the new generational leaders reacted by launching the anti-corruption campaign to eliminate corruption at the higher levels of the government.

Censorship

Since Xi became the CCP general secretary, censorship, including internet censorship, has been significantly stepped up. Chairing the 2018 China Cyberspace Governance Conference on 20 and 21 April 2018, Xi committed to "fiercely crack down on criminal offenses including hacking, telecom fraud, and violation of citizens' privacy." During a visit to Chinese state media, Xi stated that "party and government-owned media must hold the family name of the party" and that the state media "must embody the party’s will, safeguard the party’s authority".

His administration has overseen more Internet restrictions imposed in China, and is described as being "stricter across the board" on speech than previous administrations. Xi has taken a very strong stand to control internet usage inside China, including Google and Facebook, advocating Internet censorship in the country under the concept of internet sovereignty. The censorship of Wikipedia has also been stringent; as of April 2019, all versions of Wikipedia have been blocked in China. Likewise, the situation for users of Weibo has been described as a change from fearing that individual posts would be deleted, or at worst one's account, to fear of arrest.

A law enacted in September 2013 authorized a three-year prison term for bloggers who shared more than 500 times any content considered "defamatory". The State Internet Information Department summoned a group of influential bloggers to a seminar instructing them to avoid writing about politics, the CCP, or making statements contradicting official narratives. Many bloggers stopped writing about controversial topics, and Weibo went into decline, with much of its readership shifting to WeChat users speaking to very limited social circles. In 2017, telecommunications carriers in China were instructed by the government to block individuals' use of Virtual Private Networks (VPNs) by February 2018.

Xi has spoken out against "historical nihilism", meaning historical viewpoints that challenge the official line of the CCP. Xi said that one of the reasons for the collapse of the Soviet Union has been historical nihilism. The Cyberspace Administration of China (CAC) has established a telephone hotline for people to report acts of historical nihilism, while Toutiao and Douyin urged its user to report instances of historical nihilism. In May 2021, the CAC reported that it removed two million online posts for historical nihilism.

Consolidation of power

Political observers have called Xi the most powerful Chinese leader since Mao Zedong, especially since the ending of presidential two-term limits in 2018. Xi has notably departed from the collective leadership practices of his post-Mao predecessors. He has centralised his power and created working groups with himself at the head to subvert government bureaucracy, making himself become the unmistakable central figure of the new administration. Beginning in 2013, the CCP under Xi has created a series of Central Leading Groups: supra-ministerial steering committees, designed to bypass existing institutions when making decisions, and ostensibly make policy-making a more efficient process. The most notable new body is the Central Leading Group for Comprehensively Deepening Reforms. It has broad jurisdiction over economic restructuring and social reforms, and is said to have displaced some of the power previously held by the State Council and its premier.

Xi also became the leader of the Central Leading Group for Internet Security and Informatization, in charge of cyber-security and Internet policy. The Third Plenum held in 2013 also saw the creation of the National Security Commission of the CCP, another body chaired by Xi, which commentators have said would help Xi consolidate over national security affairs. In the opinion of at least one political scientist, Xi "has surrounded himself with cadres he met while stationed on the coast, Fujian and Shanghai and in Zhejiang." Control of Beijing is seen as crucial to Chinese leaders; Xi has selected Cai Qi, one of the cadres mentioned above, to manage the capital. Xi has also been believed to have diluted the authority of premier Li Keqiang, taking authority over the economy which has generally been considered to be the domain of the premier.

In March 2018, the National People's Congress (NPC) passed a set of constitutional amendments including removal of term limits for the president and vice president, the creation of a National Supervisory Commission, as well as enhancing the central role of the CCP. On 17 March 2018, the Chinese legislature reappointed Xi as president, now without term limits; Wang Qishan was appointed vice president. The following day, Li Keqiang was reappointed premier and longtime allies of Xi, Xu Qiliang and Zhang Youxia, were voted in as vice-chairmen of the CMC. Foreign minister Wang Yi was promoted to state councillor and General Wei Fenghe was named defence minister. According to the Financial Times, Xi expressed his views of constitutional amendment at meetings with Chinese officials and foreign dignitaries. Xi explained the decision in terms of needing to align two more powerful posts—general secretary of the CCP and chairman of the CMC—which have no term limits. However, Xi did not say whether he intended to serve as party general secretary, CMC chairman and state president, for three or more terms.

In its sixth plenary session in November 2021, CCP adopted a historical resolution, a kind of document that evaluated the party's history. This was the third of its kind after ones adopted by Mao Zedong and Deng Xiaoping, and the document for the first time credited Xi as being the "main innovator" of Xi Jinping Thought while also declaring Xi's leadership as being “the key to the great rejuvenation of the Chinese nation". In comparison with the other historical resolutions, Xi's one did not herald a major change in how the CCP evaluated its history. To accompany the historical resolution, the CCP promoted the terms Two Establishes and Two Safeguards, calling the CCP to unite around and protect Xi's core status within the party. In 2022, Xi appointed his close ally Wang Xiaohong as the Minister of Public Security, giving him further control over the security establishment.

The 20th National Congress of the Chinese Communist Party, held between 16 and 22 October 2022, has overseen amendments in the CCP constitution and the re-election of Xi as general secretary of the CCP and chairman of the CMC for a third term, with the overall result of the Congress being further strengthening of Xi's power. The newly amended CCP constitution included the terms two establishes and two safeguards, reinforcing Xi's power. It also included concepts promoted by Xi like common prosperity, "Chinese-style modernization" and "whole-process people’s democracy." The new Politburo Standing Committee elected just after the CCP Congress was filled almost completely with people close to Xi, with four out of the seven members of the previous PSC including premier Li Keqiang and CPPCC chairman Wang Yang stepping down. Li Qiang, a close Xi ally, became the second-ranking member of the PSC, and was further promoted to premier in 2023. Other allies of Xi, including Cai Qi, Ding Xuexiang and Li Xi have also joined the PSC, and are expected to become first secretary of the CCP Secretariat, first vice premier and secretary of the Central Commission for Discipline Inspection respectively. The only remaining members of the previous PSC except Xi were Zhao Leji and Wang Huning, though their ranking and positions changed, and became the NPC Standing Committee and CPPCC chairmen respectively on 10 March 2023. Xi's re-election made him the first party leader since Mao Zedong to serve more than three terms, though Deng Xiaoping ruled the country informally for a longer period. Xi was further re-elected as the PRC president and chairman of the PRC Central Military Commission on 10 March 2023 during the opening of the 14th National People's Congress.

Cult of personality

Xi has had a cult of personality constructed around himself since entering office with books, cartoons, pop songs and dance routines honouring his rule. Following Xi's ascension to the leadership core of the CCP, he had been referred to as Xi Dada (Uncle or Papa Xi), though this stopped in April 2016. The village of Liangjiahe, where Xi was sent to work, has become a "modern-day shrine" decorated with CCP propaganda and murals extolling the formative years of his life. The CCP's Politburo named Xi Jinping lingxiu, a reverent term for "leader" and a title previously only given to Mao Zedong and his immediate successor Hua Guofeng. He is also sometimes called the "pilot at the helm". On 25 December 2019, the Politburo officially named Xi as "People's Leader", a title only Mao had held previously.

Economy and technology

Xi was initially seen as a market reformist, and the Third Plenum of the 18th Central Committee under him announced that "market forces" would begin to play a "decisive" role in allocating resources. This meant that the state would gradually reduce its involvement in the distribution of capital, and restructure China's state-owned enterprises (SOEs) to allow further competition, potentially by attracting foreign and private sector players in industries that were previously highly regulated. This policy aimed to address the bloated state sector that had unduly profited from an earlier round of re-structuring by purchasing assets at below-market prices, assets that were no longer being used productively. Xi also launched the Shanghai Free-Trade Zone in August 2013, which was seen as part of the economic reforms. In However, by 2017, Xi's promise of economic reforms has been said to stall by experts. In 2015, the Chinese stock market bubble popped, which led Xi to use state forces to fix the issue. However,  from 2012 to 2022, the share of the market value of China's top listed companies has increased from around 10% to over 40%. He has also overseen the relaxation of restrictions on foreign direct investment (FDI) and increased cross-border holdings of stocks and bonds.

Xi has increased state control over China's economy, voicing support for SOEs, while also supporting the country's private sector. Under Xi, "government guidance funds", public-private investment funds set up by or for government bodies, have raised more than $900 billion for early funding to companies that work in sectors the government deems as strategic. Xi has increased the role of the Central Financial and Economic Affairs Commission at the expense of the State Council. His administration made it easier for banks to issue mortgages, increased foreign participation in the bond market, and increased the national currency renminbi's global role, helping it to join IMF's basket of special drawing right. In the 40th anniversary of the launching of Chinese economic reforms in 2018, he has promised to continue reforms but has warned that nobody "can dictate to the Chinese people". Xi has also personally made eradicating extreme poverty through "targeted poverty alleviation" a key goal. In 2021, Xi declared a "complete victory" over extreme poverty, saying that nearly 100 million people have been lifted out of poverty under his tenure, though some experts said that China's poverty threshold was relatively lower than the one set by the World Bank. In 2020, premier Li Keqiang, citing the National Bureau of Statistics (NBS) said that China still had 600 million people living with less than 1000 yuan ($140) a month, although an article from The Economist said that the methodology NBS used was flawed, stating that the figure took the combined income, which was then equally divided.

China's economy has grown under Xi, with GDP in nominal terms more than doubling from $8.53 trillion in 2012 to $17.73 trillion in 2021, though the rate of growth has slowed from 7.9% in 2012 to 6% in 2019. Xi has stressed the importance of "high-quality growth" rather than "inflated growth". His administration pursued a debt-deleveraging campaign, seeking to slow and cut the unsustainable amount of debt China has accrued during its economic growth. Though China's total non-financial-sector debt-to-GDP ratio reached a record 270.9% by 2020 during the COVID-19 crisis, it fell to reach around 262.5% by 2021 before going up again to 273.2% in 2022, mainly due to the pressure put by the zero-COVID policy to local finances.

Xi has circulated a policy called "dual circulation", meaning reorienting the economy towards domestic consumption while remaining open to foreign trade and investment. Xi has also made boosting productivity in the economy a priority. Xi has attempted to reform the property sector to combat the steep increase in the property prices and to cut Chinese economy's dependence on the real estate sector. In the 19th CCP National Congress, Xi declared "Houses are built to be inhabited, not for speculation". In 2020, Xi's government formulated the "three red lines" policy that aimed to deleverage the heavily indebted property sector. Xi additionally has supported a property tax, for which he has faced resistance from members of the CCP.

Xi's administration has promoted "Made in China 2025" plan that aims to make China self-reliant in key technologies, although publicly China de-emphasised this plan due to the outbreak of a trade war with the U.S. Since the outbreak of the trade war in 2018, Xi has revived calls for "self-reliance", especially on the matters of technology. In August 2022, Xi's administration has allocated more than $100 billion to support China's efforts at semiconductor independence. The Chinese government has also supported technology companies like Huawei through grants, tax breaks, credit facilities and other forms of assistance, enabling their rise but also leading to countermeasures by the U.S.

In November 2020, The Wall Street Journal reported that Xi personally ordered a halt to Ant Group's initial public offering (IPO), in reaction to its founder Jack Ma criticizing government regulation in finance. Xi's administration has also overseen a decrease in offshore IPOs by Chinese companies, with most Chinese IPOs taking place either in Shanghai or Shenzhen as of 2022, and has increasingly directed funding to IPOs of companies that works in sectors it deems as strategic, including electric vehicles, biotechnology, renewable energy, artificial intelligence, semiconductors and other high-technology manufacturing.

Since 2021, Xi has promoted the term "common prosperity", a term which he defined as an "essential requirement of socialism",  described as affluence for all and said entailed reasonable adjustments to excess incomes. Common prosperity has been used as the justification for large-scale crackdowns and regulations towards the perceived "excesses" of several sectors, most prominently tech and tutoring industries. The examples of actions taken against tech companies have included fining large tech companies and passing of laws such as the Data Security Law. China also banned private tutoring companies from making profits and teaching school syllabus during weekends and holidays, effectively destroying the whole industry. Xi additionally opened a new stock exchange in Beijing targeted for small and medium enterprises (SMEs), which was another part of his common prosperity campaign. There have also been other numerous cultural regulations, such as limiting video game usage by minors to 90 minutes during weekdays and 3 hours during weekends, complete banning of cryptocurrency, cracking down on idol worship, fandom and celebrity culture and cracking down on "sissy men". The Wall Street Journal has also reported in October 2021 that Xi had launched a round of inspections of the country's financial institutions, including state-owned banks, investment funds and financial regulators, on whether their ties to private firms had become too close, with the investigations being led by Central Commission for Discipline Inspection.

Reforms

Agenda announcement
In November 2013, at the conclusion of the Third Plenum of the 18th Central Committee, the Communist Party delivered a far-reaching reform agenda that alluded to changes in both economic and social policy. Xi signaled at the plenum that he was consolidating control of the massive internal security organization that was formerly the domain of Zhou Yongkang. A new National Security Commission was formed with Xi at its helm. The Central Leading Group for Comprehensively Deepening Reforms—another ad hoc policy coordination body led by Xi upgraded to a commission in 2018—was also formed to oversee the implementation of the reform agenda. Termed "comprehensive deepening reforms", they were said to be the most significant since Deng Xiaoping's 1992 Southern Tour. The plenum also announced economic reforms and resolved to abolish the laogai system of "re-education through labour", which was largely seen as a blot on China's human rights record. The system has faced significant criticism for years from domestic critics and foreign observers. In January 2016, a two-child policy replaced the one-child policy, which was in turn was replaced with a three-child policy in May 2021. In July 2021, all family size limits as well as penalties for exceeding them were removed.

Political reforms 
Xi's administration taken a number of changes to the structure of the CCP and state bodies, especially in a large overhaul in 2018. In March 2014, the CCP Central Committee merged the Office for External Propaganda (OEP), externally known as the State Council Information Office (SCIO), to the CCP's Central Propaganda Department. SCIO is now used by the Central Propaganda Department as an external name under an arrangement called "one institution with two names". February earlier that year oversaw the creation of the Central Leading Group for Cybersecurity and Informatization. The State Internet Information Office (SIIO), previously under the OEP and SCIO, was transferred to the central leading group and renamed in English into the Cyberspace Administration of China. As part of managing the financial system, the Financial Stability and Development Committee, a State Council body, was established in 2017. Chaired by vice premier Liu He during its existence, the committee was disestablished by the newly-established Central Financial Commission during the 2023 Party and state reforms.

2018 has seen larger reforms to the bureaucracy. In that year, several central leading groups including reform, cyberspace affairs, finance and economics. and foreign affairs were upgraded to commissions. In the area of media, the State Administration of Press, Publication, Radio, Film and Television (SAPPRFT) was renamed into the National Radio and Television Administration (NRTA) with its film, news media and publications being transferred to the Central Propaganda Department. Additionally, the control of China Central Television (CCTV, including its international edition, China Global Television), China National Radio (CNR) and China Radio International (CRI) were transferred to the newly established China Media Group (CMG) under the control of the Central Propaganda Department. Two State Council departments. one dealing with overseas Chinese, and other one dealing with religious affairs, were merged into the United Front Work Department while another commission dealing with ethnic affairs was brought under formal UFWD leadership.

2023 has seen further reforms to the CCP and state bureaucracy, most notably the strengthening of Party control over the financial and technology domains. This included the creation of two CCP bodies for overseeing finance; the Central Financial Commission (CFC), as well as the revival of the Central Financial Work Commission (CFWC) that was previously dissolved in 2002. The CFC would broadly manage the financial system while the CFWC would focus on strengthening the ideological and political role of the CCP in the sector. Additionally, a new CCP Central Science and Technology Commission would be established to broadly oversee the technology sector, while a newly-created Social Work Department was tasked with CCP interactions with several sectors, including civic groups, chambers of commerce and industry groups, as well as handling public petition and grievance work. A new Central Hong Kong and Macau Work Office would also be established, with the State Council's Hong Kong and Macau Affairs Office being turned into the new body's external name.

At the State Council, the China Banking and Insurance Regulatory Commission would be replaced by the State Administration of Financial Supervision (SAFS), which would take a much larger responsibility on financial regulation, effectively overseeing all financial activities except the securities industry, which was continued to be regulated by the China Securities Regulatory Commission, now elevated to a government body. Several regulatory responsibilities were also transferred from the People's Bank of China (PBoC) to the SAFS, while the PBoC will also reopen offices around the country that were closed in a previous reorganization.

Legal reforms
The party under Xi announced a raft of legal reforms at the Fourth Plenum held in the fall 2014, and he called for "Chinese socialistic rule of law" immediately afterwards. The party aimed to reform the legal system, which had been perceived as ineffective at delivering justice and affected by corruption, local government interference and lack of constitutional oversight. The plenum, while emphasizing the absolute leadership of the party, also called for a greater role of the constitution in the affairs of state and a strengthening of the role of the National People's Congress Standing Committee in interpreting the constitution. It also called for more transparency in legal proceedings, more involvement of ordinary citizens in the legislative process, and an overall "professionalization" of the legal workforce. The party also planned to institute cross-jurisdictional circuit legal tribunals as well as giving provinces consolidated administrative oversight over lower level legal resources, which is intended to reduce local government involvement in legal proceedings.

Military reforms
Since taking power in 2012, Xi has undertaken an overhaul of the People's Liberation Army. Military-civil fusion has advanced under Xi. Xi has been active in his participation in military affairs, taking a direct hands-on approach to military reform. In addition to being the Chairman of the CMC and leader of the Central Leading Group for Military Reform founded in 2014 to oversee comprehensive military reforms, Xi has delivered numerous high-profile pronouncements vowing to clean up malfeasance and complacency in the military. Xi has repeatedly warned that the depoliticization of the PLA from the CCP would lead to a collapse similar to that of the Soviet Union. Xi held the New Gutian Conference in 2014, gathering China's top military officers, re-emphasizing the principle of "the party has absolute control over the army" first established by Mao at the 1929 Gutian Conference.

Xi announced a reduction of 300,000 troops from the PLA in 2015, bringing its size to 2 million troops. Xi described this as a gesture of peace, while analysts such as Rory Medcalf have said that the cut was done to reduce costs as well as part of PLA's modernization. On 2016, he reduced the number of theater commands of the PLA from seven to five. He has also abolished the four autonomous general departments of the PLA, replacing them with 15 agencies directly reporting to the CMC. Two new branches of the PLA were created under his reforms, the Strategic Support Force and the Joint Logistics Support Force.

On 21 April 2016, Xi was named commander-in-chief of the country's new Joint Operations Command Center of the PLA by Xinhua News Agency and the broadcaster China Central Television. Some analysts interpreted this move as an attempt to display strength and strong leadership and as being more "political than military". According to Ni Lexiong, a military affairs expert, Xi "not only controls the military but also does it in an absolute manner, and that in wartime, he is ready to command personally". According to a University of California, San Diego expert on Chinese military, Xi "has been able to take political control of the military to an extent that exceeds what Mao and Deng have done".

Foreign policy

Xi has taken a harder line on security issues as well as foreign affairs, projecting a more nationalistic and assertive China on the world stage. His political program calls for a China more united and confident of its own value system and political structure. Foreign analysts and observers have frequently said that Xi's main foreign policy objective is to restore China's position on the global stage as a great power. Xi advocates "baseline thinking" in China's foreign policy: setting explicit red lines that other countries must not cross. In the Chinese perspective, these tough stances on baseline issues reduce strategic uncertainty, preventing other nations from misjudging China's positions or underestimating China's resolve in asserting what it perceives to be in its national interest. Xi stated during the 20th CCP National Congress that he wanted to ensure China "leads the world in terms of composite national strength and international influence" by 2049.

Xi has promoted "major-country diplomacy", stating that China is already a "big power" and breaking away from previous Chinese leaders who had a more precautious diplomacy. He has adopted a hawkish foreign policy posture called "wolf warrior diplomacy", while his foreign policy thoughts are collectively known as "Xi Jinping Thought on Diplomacy". In March 2021, he said that "the East is rising and the West is declining", saying that the power of the Western world was in decline and their COVID-19 response was an example of this, and that China was entering a period of opportunity because of this. Xi has frequently alluded to "community with a shared future for mankind", which Chinese diplomats have said doesn't imply an intention to change the international order, but which foreign observers say China wants a new order that puts it more at the centre. Under Xi, China has, along with Russia, also focused on increasing relations with the Global South in order to blunt the effect of Western sanctions.

Xi has put an emphasis on increasing China's "international discourse power" to create a more favorable global opinion of China in the world. In this pursuit, Xi has emphasised the need to "tell China's story well", meaning expanding China's external propaganda and communications. Xi has expanded the focus and scope of the united front, which aims to consolidate support for CCP in non-CCP elements both inside and outside China, and has accordingly expanded the United Front Work Department.

Security 
Under Xi, China has promoted reformation of the international system, with Xi calling for a "rejection of hegemonic power structures in global governance". Addressing a regional conference in Shanghai on 21 May 2014, he called on Asian countries to unite and forge a way together, rather than get involved with third party powers, seen as a reference to the United States. "Matters in Asia ultimately must be taken care of by Asians. Asia's problems ultimately must be resolved by Asians and Asia's security ultimately must be protected by Asians", he told the conference. In 2022, Xi proposed the Global Security Initiative (GSI), aiming to create a new global security architecture, incorporating the term "indivisible security", a concept also supported by Russia.

Africa

Under Xi, China has cut back lending to Africa after fears that African countries couldn't repay their debts to China. Xi has also promised that China would write off debts of some African countries. In November 2021, Xi promised African nations 1 billion doses of China's COVID-19 vaccines, which was in addition to the 200 million already supplied before. This has been said to be part of China's vaccine diplomacy.

European Union

China's efforts under Xi has been for the European Union (EU) to stay in a neutral position in their contest with the U.S. China and the EU announced the Comprehensive Agreement on Investment (CAI) in 2020, although the deal was later frozen due to mutual sanctions over Xinjiang. Xi has supported calls for EU to achieve "strategic autonomy", and has also called on the EU to view China "independently".

India
Relations between China and India had ups and downs under Xi, later deteriorating due to various factors. In 2013, the two countries had a standoff in Depsang for three weeks, which ended with no border change. In 2017, the two countries again had a standoff over a Chinese construction of a road in Doklam, a territory both claimed by Bhutan, India's ally, and China, though by 28 August, both countries mutually disengaged. The most serious crisis in the relationship came when the two countries had a deadly clash in 2020 at the Line of Actual Control, leaving some soldiers dead. The clashes created a serious deterioration in relations, with China seizing a small chunk of territory that India controlled.

Japan

China–Japan relations have initially soured under Xi's administration; the most thorny issue between the two countries remains the dispute over the Senkaku islands, which China calls Diaoyu. In response to Japan's continued robust stance on the issue, China declared an Air Defense Identification Zone in November 2013. However, the relations later started to improve, with Xi being invited to visit in 2020, though the trip was later delayed due to the COVID-19 pandemic. In August 2022, Kyodo News reported that Xi personally decided to let ballistic missiles to land within Japan's exclusive economic zone (EEZ) during the military exercises held around Taiwan, to send a warning to Japan.

Taiwan

In 2015, Xi met with Taiwanese president Ma Ying-jeou, which marked the first time the political leaders of both sides of the Taiwan Strait have met since the end of the Chinese Civil War in Mainland China in 1950. Xi said that China and Taiwan are "one family" that cannot be pulled apart. However, the relations started deteriorating after Tsai Ing-wen of the Democratic Progressive Party (DPP) won the presidential elections in 2016.

In the 19th Party Congress held in 2017, Xi reaffirmed six of the nine principles that had been affirmed continuously since the 16th Party Congress in 2002, with the notable exception of "Placing hopes on the Taiwan people as a force to help bring about unification". According to the Brookings Institution, Xi used stronger language on potential Taiwan independence than his predecessors towards previous DPP governments in Taiwan. He said that "we will never allow any person, any organisation, or any political party to split any part of the Chinese territory from China at any time at any form." In March 2018, Xi said that Taiwan would face the "punishment of history" for any attempts at separatism.

In January 2019, Xi Jinping called on Taiwan to reject its formal independence from China, saying: "We make no promise to renounce the use of force and reserve the option of taking all necessary means." Those options, he said, could be used against "external interference". Xi also said that they "are willing to create broad space for peaceful reunification, but will leave no room for any form of separatist activities." President Tsai responded to the speech by saying Taiwan would not accept a one country, two systems arrangement with the mainland, while stressing the need for all cross-strait negotiations to be on a government-to-government basis.

In 2022, after the Chinese military exercises around Taiwan, the PRC published a white paper called "The Taiwan Question and China’s Reunification in the New Era", which was the first white paper regards to Taiwan since 2000. The paper urged Taiwan to become a special administrative region of the PRC under the one country two systems formula, and said that "a small number of countries, the U.S. foremost amongst them" are "using Taiwan to contain China". Notably, the new white paper excluded a part that previously said the PRC would not send troops or officials to Taiwan after unification.

Middle East

While China has historically been wary of getting closer to the Middle East countries, Xi has changed this approach. China has grown closer to both Iran and Saudi Arabia under Xi. During a visit to Iran in 2016, Xi proposed a large cooperation program with Iran, a deal that was later signed in 2021. China has also sold ballistic missiles to Saudi Arabia and is helping build 7,000 schools in Iraq. In 2013, Xi proposed a peace deal between Israel and Palestine that entails a two-state solution based on the 1967 borders. Turkey, with whom relations were long strained over Uyghurs, has also grown closer to China. On 10 March 2023, Saudi Arabia and Iran agreed to restore diplomatic ties cut in 2016 after a deal brokered between the two countries by China following secret talks in Beijing.

North Korea

Under Xi, China has initially taken a more critical stance on North Korea due to its nuclear tests. However, starting in 2018, the relations started to improve due to meetings between Xi and North Korean leader Kim Jong-un. Xi has also supported denuclearization of North Korea, and has voiced support for economic reforms in the country. At the G20 meeting in Japan, Xi called for a "timely easing" of sanctions imposed on North Korea. After the 20th CCP National Congress in 2022, Rodong Sinmun, official newspaper of the ruling Workers' Party of Korea, wrote a long editorial praising Xi, titling both Kim and Xi Suryong (수령), a title historically reserved for North Korea's founder Kim Il-sung.

Russia

Xi has cultivated stronger relations with Russia, particularly in the wake of the Ukraine crisis of 2014. He seems to have developed a strong personal relationship with president Vladimir Putin. Both are viewed as strong leaders with a nationalist orientation who are not afraid to assert themselves against Western interests. Xi attended the opening ceremonies of the 2014 Winter Olympics in Sochi. Under Xi, China signed a $400 billion gas deal with Russia; China has also become Russia's largest trading partner.

Xi and Putin met on 4 February 2022 during the run up to the 2022 Beijing Olympics during the massive Russian build-up of force on the Ukrainian border, with the two expressing that the two countries are nearly united in their anti-US alignment and that both nations shared "no limits" to their commitments. U.S. officials said that China had asked Russia to wait for the invasion of Ukraine until after the Beijing Olympics ended on 20 February. In April 2022, Xi Jinping expressed opposition to sanctions against Russia. On 15 June 2022, Xi Jinping reasserted China's support for Russia on issues of sovereignty and security. However, Xi also said China is committed to respecting "the territorial integrity of all countries", and said China was "pained to see the flames of war reignited in Europe". China has additionally kept a distance from Russia's actions, instead putting itself as a neutral party.

During the war Ukrainian president Volodymyr Zelenskyy has given a nuanced take to China, saying that the country has the economic leverage to pressure Putin to end the war, adding "I’m sure that without the Chinese market for the Russian Federation, Russia would be feeling complete economic isolation. That’s something that China can do – to limit the trade [with Russia] until the war is over." In August 2022, Zelenskyy said that since the beginning of the war in Ukraine, Xi Jinping had refused all his requests for direct talks with him. He additionally said that while he would like China to take a different approach to the war in Ukraine, he also wanted the relationship to improve every year and said that China and Ukraine shared similar values.

South Korea

Xi has initially improved relationships with South Korea, and the two countries signed a free-trade agreement in December 2015. Starting in 2017, China's relationship with South Korea soured over the Terminal High Altitude Area Defence (THAAD), a missile defence system, purchase of the latter. which China sees as a threat but which South Korea says is a defence measure against North Korea. Ultimately, South Korea halted the purchase of the THAAD after China imposed unofficial sanctions. China's relations with South Korea improved again under president Moon Jae-in.

Southeast Asia
Since Xi came to power, China has been rapidly building and militarizing islands in the South China Sea, a decision Study Times of the Central Party School said was personally taken by Xi. In April 2015, new satellite imagery revealed that China was rapidly constructing an airfield on Fiery Cross Reef in the Spratly Islands of the South China Sea. In May 2015, U.S. Secretary of Defense Ash Carter warned the government of Xi to halt its rapid island-building in disputed territory in the South China Sea. In November 2014, in a major policy address, Xi called for a decrease in the use of force, preferring dialogue and consultation to solve the current issues plaguing the relationship between China and its South East Asian neighbors.

United States

Xi has called China–United States relations in the contemporary world a "new type of great-power relations", a phrase the Obama administration had been reluctant to embrace. Under his administration the Strategic and Economic Dialogue that began under Hu Jintao has continued. On China–U.S. relations, Xi said, "If [China and the United States] are in confrontation, it would surely spell disaster for both countries".  The U.S. has been critical of Chinese actions in the South China Sea. In 2014, Chinese hackers compromised the computer system of the U.S. Office of Personnel Management, resulting in the theft of approximately 22 million personnel records handled by the office.

Xi has also indirectly spoken out critically on the U.S. "strategic pivot" to Asia. Relations with the U.S. soured after Donald Trump became president in 2017. Since 2018, U.S. and China have been engaged in an escalating trade war. In 2020, the relations further deteriorated due to the COVID-19 pandemic. In 2021, Xi has called the U.S. the biggest threat to China's development, saying that "the biggest source of chaos in the present-day world is the United States". Xi has also scrapped a previous policy in which China didn't challenge the U.S. in most instances, while Chinese officials said that they now see China as an "equal" to the U.S. On 6 March 2023, during a speech to the Chinese People's Political Consultative Conference (CPPCC), Xi said that "Western countries—led by the U.S.—have implemented all-round containment, encirclement and suppression" against China, which he said brought "unprecedentedly severe challenges to our country’s development".

Foreign trips as paramount leader

Xi made his first foreign trip as China's paramount leader to Russia on 22 March 2013, about a week after he assumed the presidency. He met with President Vladimir Putin and the two leaders discussed trade and energy issues. He then went on to Tanzania, South Africa (where he attended the BRICS summit in Durban), and the Republic of the Congo. Xi visited the United States at Sunnylands Estate in California in a 'shirtsleeves summit' with U.S. President Barack Obama in June 2013, although this was not considered a formal state visit. In October 2013, Xi attended the APEC Summit in Bali, Indonesia.

In March 2014, Xi made a trip to Western Europe visiting the Netherlands, where he attended the Nuclear Security Summit in The Hague, followed by visits to France, Germany and Belgium. He made a state visit to South Korea on 4 July 2014 and met with South Korean President Park Geun-hye. Between 14 and 23 July, Xi attended the BRICS leaders' summit in Brazil and visited Argentina, Venezuela, and Cuba.

Xi went on an official state visit to India and met with Indian prime minister Narendra Modi in September 2014; he visited New Delhi and also went to Modi's hometown in the state of Gujarat. He went on a state visit to Australia and met with Prime Minister Tony Abbott in November 2014, followed by a visit to the island nation of Fiji. Xi visited Pakistan in April 2015, signing a series of infrastructure deals worth $45 billion related to the China–Pakistan Economic Corridor. During his visit, Pakistan's highest civilian award, the Nishan-e-Pakistan, was conferred upon him. He then headed to Jakarta and Bandung, Indonesia, to attend the Afro-Asian Leaders Summit and the 60th Anniversary events of the Bandung Conference. Xi visited Russia and was the guest-of-honour of Russian president Vladimir Putin at the 2015 Moscow Victory Day Parade to mark the 70th Anniversary of the victory of the allies in Europe. At the parade, Xi and his wife Peng Liyuan sat next to Putin. On the same trip Xi also visited Kazakhstan and met with that country's president Nursultan Nazarbayev, and also met Alexander Lukashenko in Belarus.

In September 2015, Xi made his first state visit to the United States. In October 2015, he made a state visit to the United Kingdom, the first by a Chinese leader in a decade. This followed a visit to China in March 2015 by the Duke of Cambridge. During the state visit, Xi met Queen Elizabeth II, British prime minister David Cameron and other dignitaries. Increased customs, trade, and research collaborations between China and the U.K. were discussed, but more informal events also took place including a visit to Manchester City's football academy.

In March 2016, Xi visited the Czech Republic on his way to the United States. In Prague, he met with the Czech president, prime minister and other representatives to promote relations and economic cooperation between the Czech Republic and the PRC. His visit was met by a considerable number of protests by Czechs.

In January 2017, Xi became the first Chinese paramount leader to plan to attend the World Economic Forum in Davos. On 17 January, Xi addressed the forum in a high-profile keynote, addressing globalization, the global trade agenda, and China's rising place in the world's economy and international governance; he made a series of pledges about China's defense of "economic globalization" and climate change accords. Premier Li Keqiang attended the forum in 2015 and Vice-president Li Yuanchao did so in 2016. During the three-day state visit to the country in 2017 Xi also visited the World Health Organization, the United Nations and the International Olympic Committee.

On 20 June 2019, Xi visited Pyongyang, becoming the first Chinese leader to visit North Korea since his predecessor Hu Jintao's visit in 2004. On 27 June, he attended the G20 summit in Osaka. On 17 January 2020, Xi visited Myanmar, meeting president Win Myint, state councillor Aung San Suu Kyi and military leader Min Aung Hlaing in Naypyidaw.

Between 2020 and 2022, Xi paused foreign travel, speculated to be due to the COVID-19 pandemic. On 14 February 2022, Xi visited Astana, Kazakhstan, his first trip overseas since the start of the pandemic, meeting president Kassym-Jomart Tokayev. A day later, he visited Uzbekistan to attend the 2022 Shanghai Cooperation Organisation summit. There he met with Central Asian leaders as well as Russian president Vladimir Putin, his first since Russia invaded Ukraine on 24 February 2022.

Between 15 and 16 November 2022, Xi attended the G20 Summit in Bali, meeting numerous world leaders including the US president Joe Biden, Australian prime minister Antony Albanese, French president Emmanuel Macron and South Korean president Yoon Suk-yeol. Between 16 and 19 November, he attended the APEC Summit in Thailand, meeting leaders including Japanese prime minister Fumio Kishida, New Zealand prime minister Jacinda Ardern, Thai prime minister Prayut Chan-o-cha and US vice president Kamala Harris. Between 7 and 10 December, he visited Riyadh, Saudi Arabia, where he met king Salman, and crown prince and prime minister Mohammed bin Salman. He also met with numerous Arab leaders, including members of the Gulf Cooperation Council. During the meeting, he signed numerous commercial deals with Saudi Arabia and formally elevated the relationship to comprehensive strategic partnership, highest level in China's formal ranking of relations with other countries.

Economic relations

The Belt and Road Initiative (BRI) was unveiled by Xi in September and October 2013 during visits to Kazakhstan and Indonesia, and was thereafter promoted by Premier Li Keqiang during state visits to Asia and Europe. Xi made the announcement for the initiative while in Astana, Kazakhstan, and called it a "golden opportunity". BRI has been called Xi's "signature project", involving numerous infrastructure development and investment projects throughout Asia, Europe, Africa, and the Americas. BRI was added to the CCP Constitution at the closing session of the 19th Party Congress on 24 October 2017, further elevating its importance. Since the BRI was launched, China became the world's largest lender, lending about $1 trillion in a decade to almost 150 countries. However, by 2022, many BRI projects have stalled, and most of China's debt became held by countries in financial distress, leading the Chinese leaders to adopt a more conservative approach to BRI, dubbed as "Belt and Road Initiative 2.0".

Xi officially proposed the Asian Infrastructure Investment Bank (AIIB) in October 2013 during a visit to Indonesia, which officially launched in January 2016. The membership of the AIIB has included numerous countries, including allies of the United States and Western countries, despite opposition from the US. Since its launch until 2022, AIIB has invested $36.43 billion to 190 projects. Xi's tenure has seen a signing of several free-trade deals, including with Australia in 2014, South Korea in 2015, and the larger Regional Comprehensive Economic Partnership (RCEP) in 2020. Xi has also expressed his interest in China joining the Comprehensive and Progressive Agreement for Trans-Pacific Partnership (CPTPP), with China formally applying to join in September 2021.

National security
Xi has devoted a large amount of work towards national security, calling for a "holistic national security architecture" that encompasses "all aspects of the work of the party and the country". During a private talk with U.S. president Obama and vice president Biden, he said that China had been a target of "colour revolutions", foreshadowing his focus on national security. Since its creation by Xi, the National Security Commission has established local security committees, focusing on dissent. In the name of national security, Xi's government has passed numerous laws including a counterespionage law in 2014, national security and a counterterrorism law in 2015, a cybersecurity law and a law restricting foreign NGOs in 2016, a national intelligence law in 2017, and a data security law in 2021.

Under Xi, China's mass surveillance network has dramatically grown, with comprehensive profiles being built for each citizen. He has also advocated for international security cooperation; during a meeting of the Shanghai Cooperation Organisation (SCO) in September 2021, he spoke out against "interference in other countries’ internal affairs", and called for joint cooperation in warding off against "colour revolutions".

Hong Kong

During his leadership, Xi has supported and pursued a greater political and economic integration of Hong Kong to mainland China, including through projects such as the Hong Kong–Zhuhai–Macau Bridge. He has pushed for the Greater Bay Area project, which aims to integrate Hong Kong, Macau, and nine other cities in Guangdong. Xi's push for greater integration has created fears of decreasing freedoms in Hong Kong. Many of views held by the central government and eventually implemented in Hong Kong were outlined in a white paper published by the State Council in 2014 named The Practice of the 'One Country, Two Systems' Policy in the Hong Kong Special Administrative Region, which outlined that the China's central government has "comprehensive jurisdiction" over Hong Kong. Under Xi, the Chinese government also declared the Sino-British Joint Declaration to be legally void.

In August 2014, the Standing Committee of the National People's Congress (NPCSC) made a decision allowing universal suffrage for the 2017 election of the chief executive of Hong Kong, but also requiring the candidates to "love the country, and love Hong Kong", as well as other measures that ensured the Chinese leadership would be the ultimate decision-maker on the selection, leading to protests, and the eventual rejection of the reform bill in the Legislative Council due to a walk-out by the pro-Beijing camp to delay to vote. In the 2017 chief executive election, Carrie Lam was victorious, reportedly with the endorsement of the CCP Politburo.

Xi has supported the Hong Kong Government and Carrie Lam against the protesters in the 2019–2020 Hong Kong protests, which broke out after a proposed bill that would allow extraditions to China. He has defended the Hong Kong police's use of force, saying that "We sternly support the Hong Kong police to take forceful actions in enforcing the law, and the Hong Kong judiciary to punish in accordance with the law those who have committed violent crimes." While visiting Macau on 20 December 2019 as part of the 20th anniversary of its return to China, Xi warned of foreign forces interfering in Hong Kong and Macau, while also hinting that Macau could be a model for Hong Kong to follow.

In 2020, the NPCSC passed a national security law in Hong Kong that dramatically expanded government clampdown over the opposition in the city; amongst the measures were the dramatic restriction on political opposition and the creation of a central government office outside Hong Kong jurisdiction to oversee the enforcement of the law. This was seem as the culmination of a long-term project under Xi to further closely integrate Hong Kong with the mainland. Xi visited Hong Kong as president in 2017 and 2022, in the 20th and 25th anniversary of the handover of Hong Kong respectively. In his 2022 visit, he swore in John Lee as chief executive, a former police officer that was backed by the Chinese government to expand control over the city. While in the city, he said Hong Kong had moved from "chaos" to "stability". Since John Lee became chief executive, Hong Kong government officials including Lee himself have shown public displays of loyalty towards Xi, similar to the mainland but previously unheard in the city.

Human rights

According to the Human Rights Watch, Xi has "started a broad and sustained offensive on human rights" since he became leader in 2012. The HRW also said that repression in China is "at its worst level since the Tiananmen Square massacre." Since taking power, Xi has cracked down on grassroots activism, with hundreds being detained. He presided over the 709 crackdown on 9 July 2015, which saw more than 200 lawyers, legal assistants and human rights activists being detained. His term has seen the arrest and imprisonment of activists such as Xu Zhiyong, as well as numerous others who identified with the New Citizens' Movement. Prominent legal activist Pu Zhiqiang of the Weiquan movement was also arrested and detained.

In 2017, the local government of the Jiangxi province told Christians to replace their pictures of Jesus with Xi Jinping as part of a general campaign on unofficial churches in the country. According to local social media, officials "transformed them from believing in religion to believing in the party". According to activists, "Xi is waging the most severe systematic suppression of Christianity in the country since religious freedom was written into the Chinese constitution in 1982", and according to pastors and a group that monitors religion in China, has involved "destroying crosses, burning bibles, shutting churches and ordering followers to sign papers renouncing their faith".

Under Xi, the CCP has embraced assimilationist policies towards ethnic minorities, scaling back affirmative action in the country by 2019, and scrapping a wording in October 2021 that guaranteed the rights of minority children to be educated in their native language, replacing it with one that emphasized teaching the national language. In 2020, Chen Xiaojiang was appointed as head of the National Ethnic Affairs Commission, the first Han Chinese head of the body since 1954. On 24 June 2022, Pan Yue, another Han Chinese, became the head of the Commission, with him reportedly holding assimilationist policies toward ethnic minorities. Xi outlined his official views relations between the majority Han Chinese and ethnic minorities by saying "[n]either Han chauvinism nor local ethnic chauvinism is conducive to the development of a community for the Chinese nation"

Xinjiang 
Following several terrorist attacks in Xinjiang in 2013 and 2014, the CCP leaders help a secret meeting to find a solution to the attacks, leading to Xi to launch the Strike Hard Campaign Against Violent Terrorism in 2014, which involved mass detention, and surveillance of ethnic Uyghurs there. Xi made an inspection tour in Xinjiang between 27 and 30 April in 2014. The program was massively expanded in 2016, after the appointment of Chen Quanguo as the Xinjiang CCP secretary. The campaign included the detainment of 1.8 million people in internment camps, mostly Uyghurs but also including other ethnic and religious minorities, by 2020, and a birth suppression campaign that led to a large drop in the Uyghur birth rate by 2019. Various human rights groups and former inmates have described the camps as "concentration camps", where Uyghurs and other minorities have been forcibly assimilated into China's majority ethnic Han society. This program has been called a genocide by some observers, while a report by the UN Human Rights Office said they may amount to crimes against humanity.

Internal Chinese government documents leaked to the press in November 2019 showed that Xi personally ordered a security crackdown in Xinjiang, saying that the party must show "absolutely no mercy" and that officials use all the "weapons of the people's democratic dictatorship" to suppress those "infected with the virus of extremism". The papers also showed that Xi repeatedly discussed about Islamic extremism in his speeches, likening it to a "virus" or a "drug" that could be only addressed by "a period of painful, interventionary treatment." However, he also warned against the discrimination against Uyghurs and rejected proposals to eradicate Islam in China, calling that kind of viewpoint "biased, even wrong". Xi's exact role in the building of internment camps has not been publicly reported, though he's widely believed to be behind them and his words have been the source for major justifications in the crackdown in Xinjiang. In the Xinjiang Police Files leaked in 2022, a document quoting Minister of Public Security Zhao Kezhi suggested that Xi had been aware of the internment camps.

COVID-19 pandemic
On 20 January 2020, Xi commented for the first time on the emerging COVID-19 pandemic in Wuhan, and ordered "efforts to curb the spread" of the virus. He gave premier Li Keqiang some responsibility over the COVID-19 response, in what has been suggested by The Wall Street Journal was an attempt to potentially insulate himself from criticism if the response failed. The government initially responded to the pandemic with a lockdown and censorship, with the initial response causing widespread backlash within China. He met with Tedros Adhanom Ghebreyesus, the director-general of the World Health Organization (WHO), on 28 January. Der Spiegel reported that in January 2020 Xi pressured Tedros Adhanom to hold off on issuing a global warning about the outbreak of COVID-19 and hold back information on human-to-human transmission of the virus, allegations denied by the WHO. On 5 February, Xi met with Cambodian prime minister Hun Sen in Beijing, the first foreign leader allowed into China since the outbreak. After the COVID-19 outbreak got under control in Wuhan, Xi visited the city on 10 March.

After getting the outbreak in Wuhan under control, Xi has favoured what has officially been termed "dynamic zero-COVID policy" that aims to control and suppress the virus as much as possible within the country's borders. This has involved local lockdowns and mass-testing. While initially credited for China's suppression of the COVID-19 outbreak, the policy was later criticized by foreign and some domestic observers for being out of touch with the rest of the world and taking a heavy toll on the economy. This approach has especially come under criticism during a 2022 lockdown on Shanghai, which forced millions to their homes and damaged the city's economy, denting the image of Li Qiang, close Xi ally and Party secretary of the city. Conversely, Xi has said that the policy was designed to protect people's life safety. On 23 July 2022, the National Health Commission reported that Xi and other top leaders have taken the local COVID-19 vaccines.

At the 20th CCP Congress, Xi confirmed the continuation of the zero-COVID policy, stating he would "unswervingly" carry out "dynamic zero-COVID" and promising to "resolutely win the battle," though China started a limited easing of the policies in the following weeks. In November 2022, protests broke out against China's COVID-19 policies, with a fire in a high-rise apartment building in Ürümqi being the trigger. The protests were held in multiple major cities, with some of the protesters demanding the end of Xi's and the CCP's rule. The protests were mostly suppressed by December, though the government further eased COVID-19 restrictions in the time since. On 7 December 2022, China announced large-scale changes to its COVID-19 policy, including allowing quarantine at home for mild infections, reducing of PCR testing, and decreasing the power of local officials to implement lockdowns.

Environmental policy

In September 2020, Xi announced that China will "strengthen its 2030 climate target (NDC), peak emissions before 2030 and aim to achieve carbon neutrality before 2060". If accomplished, this would lower the expected rise in global temperature by 0.2–0.3 °C – "the biggest single reduction ever estimated by the Climate Action Tracker". Xi mentioned the link between the COVID-19 pandemic and nature destruction as one of the reasons for the decision, saying that "Humankind can no longer afford to ignore the repeated warnings of nature." On 27 September, Chinese scientists presented a detailed plan how to achieve the target. In September 2021, Xi announced that China will not build "coal-fired power projects abroad, which was said to be potentially "pivotal" in reducing emissions. The Belt and Road Initiative did not include financing such projects already in the first half of 2021.

Xi Jinping did not attend COP26 personally. However, a Chinese delegation led by climate change envoy Xie Zhenhua did attend. During the conference, the United States and China agreed on a framework to reduce GHG emission by co-operating on different measures.

Governance style
Known as a very secretive leader, little is known publicly about how Xi makes political decisions, or how he came to power. Xi's speeches generally get released months or years after they are made. Xi has also never given a press conference since becoming paramount leader, except in rare joint press conferences with foreign leaders. The Wall Street Journal reported that Xi prefers micromanaging in governance, in contrast to previous leaders such as Hu Jintao who left details of major policies to lower-ranking officials. Reportedly, ministerial officials try to get Xi's attention in various ways, with some creating slide shows and audio reports. The Wall Street Journal also reported that Xi created a performance-review system in 2018 to give evaluations on officials on various measures, including loyalty. According to The Economist, Xi's orders have generally been vague, leaving lower level officials to interpret his words. Chinese state media Xinhua News Agency said that Xi "personally reviews every draft of major policy documents" and "all reports submitted to him, no matter how late in the evening, were returned with instructions the following morning". Xi called for officials to practice self-criticism which, according to observers, is in order to appear less corrupt and more popular among the people.

Political positions

Chinese Dream

Xi and CCP ideologues coined the phrase "Chinese Dream" to describe his overarching plans for China as its leader. Xi first used the phrase during a high-profile visit to the National Museum of China on 29 November 2012, where he and his Standing Committee colleagues were attending a "national revival" exhibition. Since then, the phrase has become the signature political slogan of the Xi era. The origin of the term "Chinese Dream" is unclear. While the phrase has been used before by journalists and scholars, some publications have posited the term likely drew its inspiration from the concept of the American Dream. The Economist noted the abstract and seemingly accessible nature of the concept with no specific overarching policy stipulations may be a deliberate departure from the jargon-heavy ideologies of his predecessors. Xi has linked the "Chinese Dream" with the phrase "great rejuvenation of the Chinese nation".

Cultural revival
In recent years, top political leaders of the CCP such as Xi have overseen the rehabilitation of ancient Chinese philosophical figures like Han Fei into the mainstream of Chinese thought alongside Confucianism. At a meeting with other officials in 2013, he quoted Confucius, saying "he who rules by virtue is like the Pole Star, it maintains its place, and the multitude of stars pay homage." While visiting Shandong, the birthplace of Confucius, in November, he told scholars that the Western world was "suffering a crisis of confidence" and that the CCP has been "the loyal inheritor and promoter of China's outstanding traditional culture."

According to several analysts, Xi's leadership has been characterised by a resurgence of the ancient political philosophy Legalism. Han Fei gained new prominence with favourable citations; one sentence of Han Fei's that Xi quoted appeared thousands of times in official Chinese media at the local, provincial, and national levels. Xi has additionally supported the Neo-Confucian philosopher Wang Yangming, telling local leaders to promote him.

Xi has also overseen a revival of traditional Chinese culture, breaking apart from CCP's path, which had often attacked it. He has called traditional culture the "soul" of the nation and the "foundation" of the CCP's culture. Hanfu, the traditional dress of Han Chinese, has seen a revival under him, associated with the revival of traditional culture.

Ideology

Xi has said that "only socialism can save China". Xi has also declared Deng Xiaoping's socialism with Chinese characteristics to be the "only correct path to realize national rejuvenation". According to BBC News, while the CCP was perceived to have abandoned its communist ideology since it initiated economic reforms in the 1970s, Xi is believed by some observers to be more believing in the "idea of a communist project", being described as a Marxist–Leninist by former Australian prime minister Kevin Rudd. Xi's emphasis on prioritizing ideology has included re-asserting the eventual realization of communism as the Party's goal and reprimanding those who dismiss communism as impractical or irrelevant. Xi described the communist ideal as the "calcium" in a Party member's spine, without which the Party member would suffer the "osteoporosis" of political decay and be unable to stand upright.

Subscribing to the view that socialism will eventually triumph over capitalism, Xi has said "Marx and Engels's analysis of the basic contradictions of capitalist society is not outdated, nor is the historical materialist view that capitalism is bound to die out and socialism bound to win". Xi has overseen the increase of "Socialist Political Economy With Chinese Characteristics" as a major study topic for academics in China, aiming to decrease the influence of Western-influenced economics. Though he has called a stop to what he considers to be "disorderly expansion of capital", he has also said that "it is necessary to stimulate the vitality of capital of all types, including nonpublic capital, and give full play to its positive role".

Xi has supported greater CCP control over the PRC, saying "government, the military, society and schools, north, south, east and west – the party leads them all". During the 100th anniversary of the CCP in 2021, he said that "without the Communist Party of China, there would be no new China and no national rejuvenation", and that "the leadership of the Party is the defining feature of socialism with Chinese characteristics and constitutes the greatest strength of this system". He has said that China, despite many setbacks, has achieved great progress under the CCP, saying that "socialism with Chinese characteristics has become the standard-bearer of 21st-century socialist development". However, he has also warned that it will take a long time for China under the CCP to complete its rejuvenation, and during this timeframe, party members must be vigilant to not let CCP rule collapse.

Xi has ruled out a multi-party system for China, saying that "constitutional monarchy, imperial restoration, parliamentarism, a multi-party system and a presidential system, we considered them, tried them, but none worked". However, Xi considers China to be a democracy, saying that "China’s socialist democracy is the most comprehensive, genuine and effective democracy". China's definition of democracy is different from liberal democracies and is rooted in Marxism–Leninism, and is based on the phrases "people's democratic dictatorship" and "democratic centralism". Xi has additionally coined the term "whole-process people's democracy" which he said was about having "the people as masters". Foreign analysts and observers have widely disputed that China is a democracy, saying that it is a one-party authoritarian state and Xi an authoritarian leader. Some observers have called Xi a dictator, citing the large centralisation of power around him unseen compared to his predecessors. Xi has additionally rejected Westernisation as the only way to modernize, instead promoting what he says is "Chinese-style modernisation". He has identified five concepts as part of Chinese-style modernisation, including modernisation of a huge population, common prosperity, material and cultural-ethical advancement, harmony between humanity and nature, and peaceful development.

Document Number Nine
Document No. 9, officially the ″Communiqué on the Current State of the Ideological Sphere″, is a confidential internal document widely circulated within the CCP in 2013 by the party's General Office. It was published in July 2012. The document officially warns of promoting seven dangerous Western values:

 Western Constitutional Democracy: an attempt to undermine the current leadership and the socialism with Chinese characteristics system of governance;
 "Universal values" in an attempt to weaken the theoretical foundations of the Party's leadership;
 Civil society in an attempt to dismantle the ruling party's social foundation;
 Neoliberalism, attempting to change China's Basic Economic System;
 West's idea of journalism, challenging China's principle that the media and publishing system should be subject to Party discipline;
 Historical nihilism, trying to undermine the history of the CCP and of New China; and
 Questioning Reform and Opening and the socialist nature of socialism with Chinese characteristics.

Although it predates Xi Jinping's formal rise to the top party and state posts, the release of this internal document, which has introduced new topics that were previously not "off-limits", was being closely associated with Xi Jinping by The New York Times.

Xi Jinping Thought

In September 2017, the CCP Central Committee decided that Xi's political philosophies, generally referred to as "Xi Jinping Thought on Socialism with Chinese Characteristics for a New Era", would become part of the Party Constitution. Xi first made mention of the "Thought on Socialism with Chinese Characteristics for a New Era" in his opening day speech delivered to the 19th Party Congress in October 2017. His Politburo Standing Committee colleagues, in their own reviews of Xi's keynote address at the Congress, prepended the name "Xi Jinping" in front of "Thought". On 24 October 2017, at its closing session, the 19th Party Congress approved the incorporation of Xi Jinping Thought into the Constitution of the CCP, while in March 2018, the National People's Congress changed the state constitution to include Xi Jinping Thought.

Xi himself has described the Thought as part of the broad framework created around socialism with Chinese characteristics, a term coined by Deng Xiaoping that places China in the primary stage of socialism. In official party documentation and pronouncements by Xi's colleagues, the Thought is said to be a continuation of Marxism–Leninism, Mao Zedong Thought, Deng Xiaoping Theory, the Three Represents, and the Scientific Outlook on Development, as part of a series of guiding ideologies that embody "Marxism adopted to Chinese conditions" and contemporary considerations. It has additionally been described as the "21st century Marxism" by two professors in the Central Party School of the CCP. Wang Huning, a top political adviser and a close ally of Xi, has been described as pivotal to developing Xi Jinping Thought. The concepts and context behind Xi Jinping Thought are elaborated in Xi's The Governance of China book series, published by the Foreign Languages Press for an international audience. Volume one was published in September 2014, followed by volume two in November 2017.

An app for teaching Xi Jinping Thought had become the most popular smartphone app in China in 2019, as the country's ruling CCP launched a new campaign that calls on its cadres to immerse themselves in the political doctrine every day. Xuexi Qiangguo is now the most downloaded item on Apple's domestic App Store, surpassing in demand social media apps such as WeChat and TikTok. In 2021, the government included Xi Jinping Thought in the curriculum including to students from primary schools to university, which created pushback from parents. For much of the preceding 30 years, political ideology and communist doctrine were not a standard taught in Chinese schools until middle school, and textbooks featured a wider set of Chinese leaders with less emphasis on a single leader like Xi.

Personal life

Family

Xi's first marriage was to Ke Lingling, the daughter of Ke Hua, China's ambassador to the United Kingdom in the early 1980s. They divorced within a few years. The two were said to fight "almost every day", and after the divorce Ke moved to England. In 1987, Xi married the prominent Chinese folk singer Peng Liyuan. Xi and Peng were introduced by friends as many Chinese couples were in the 1980s. Xi was reputedly academic during their courtship, inquiring about singing techniques. Peng Liyuan, a household name in China, was better known to the public than Xi until his political elevation. The couple frequently lived apart due largely to their separate professional lives. Peng has played a much more visible role as China's "first lady" compared to her predecessors; for example, Peng hosted U.S. First Lady Michelle Obama on her high-profile visit to China in March 2014.

Xi and Peng have a daughter named Xi Mingze, who graduated from Harvard University in the spring of 2015. While at Harvard, she used a pseudonym and studied Psychology and English. Xi's family has a home in Jade Spring Hill, a garden and residential area in north-western Beijing run by the CMC.

In June 2012, Bloomberg News reported that members of Xi's extended family have substantial business interests, although there was no evidence he had intervened to assist them. The Bloomberg website was blocked in mainland China in response to the article. Since Xi embarked on an anti-corruption campaign, The New York Times reported members of his family were selling their corporate and real estate investments beginning in 2012. Relatives of highly placed Chinese officials, including seven current and former senior leaders of the Politburo of the CCP, have been named in the Panama Papers, including Deng Jiagui, Xi's brother-in-law. Deng had two shell companies in the British Virgin Islands while Xi was a member of the Politburo Standing Committee, but they were dormant by the time Xi became general secretary of the CCP in November 2012.

Personality
Peng described Xi as hardworking and down-to-earth: "When he comes home, I've never felt as if there's some leader in the house. In my eyes, he's just my husband." Xi was described in a 2011 Washington Post article by those who know him as "pragmatic, serious, cautious, hard-working, down to earth and low-key". He was described as a good hand at problem solving and "seemingly uninterested in the trappings of high office".

Public life
It is hard to gauge the opinion of the Chinese public on Xi, as no independent surveys exist in China and social media is heavily censored. However, he is believed to be widely popular in the country. According to a 2014 poll co-sponsored by the Harvard Kennedy School's Ash Center for Democratic Governance and Innovation, Xi ranked 9 out of 10 in domestic approval ratings. A YouGov poll released in July 2019 found that about 22% of people in mainland China list Xi as the person they admire the most, a plurality, although this figure was less than 5% for residents of Hong Kong. In the spring of 2019, the Pew Research Center made a survey on confidence on Xi Jinping among six-country medians based on Australia, India, Indonesia, Japan, Philippines and South Korea. The survey indicated that a median 29% have confidence in Xi Jinping to do the right thing regarding world affairs, meanwhile a median of 45% have no confidence. These numbers are slightly higher than those of North Korean leader Kim Jong-un (23% confidence, 53% no confidence). A poll by Politico and Morning Consult in 2021 found that 5% of Americans have a favorable opinion of Xi, 38% unfavorable, 17% no opinion and 40%, a plurality, never hearing of him.

In 2017, The Economist named him the most powerful person in the world. In 2018, Forbes ranked him as the most powerful and influential person in the world, replacing Russian President Vladimir Putin, who had been ranked so for five consecutive years. In 2016 and 2021, Reporters Without Borders, an international non-profit and non-governmental organization with the stated aim of safeguarding the right to freedom of information, included Xi among the list of press freedom predators.

Unlike previous Chinese leaders, Chinese state media has given a more encompassing view of Xi's private life, although still strictly controlled. According to Xinhua News Agency, Xi would swim one kilometer and walk every day as long as there was time, and is interested in foreign writers, especially Russian. He is known to love films and TV shows such as Saving Private Ryan, The Departed, The Godfather and Game of Thrones, also praising the independent film-maker Jia Zhangke. The Chinese state media has also cast him as a fatherly figure and a man of the people, determined to stand up for Chinese interests.

Honors

Key to the City 
Xi holds a "key to the city", an honor granted to attending guests to symbolize their significance, in:

  Muscatine, Iowa, United States (26 April 1985)
  Montego Bay, Jamaica (13 February 2009)
  Muscatine, Iowa, United States (14 February 2012)
  (3 June 2013)
 , Mexico (5 June 2013)
 , Argentina (19 July 2014)
, Czech Republic (29 March 2016)
  Madrid, Spain (28 November 2018)

Honorary doctorates
  Nazarbayev University (7 September 2013)
  University of Johannesburg (11 April 2019)
  Saint Petersburg State University (6 June 2019)
  King Saud University (8 December 2022)

Works

Notes

References

Citations

Works cited

Further reading

 
  
 
 
 
  
 
 
 
 includes McGregor, Richard. "Xi Jinping's Quest to Dominate China." Foreign Affairs 98 (Sept 2019): 18+.
 Magnus, George. Red Flags: Why Xi's China is in Danger (Yale UP, 2018). 
 
 
  Review of comment accompanying Xi's visit.
  Describes Xi Jinping's life.

External links

 Biography at Chinavitae.com
 
 Xi Jinping collected news and commentary at the China Digital Times
 
 
 
 U.S. Embassy Beijing, Portrait of Xi Jinping, via United States diplomatic cables leak
 Xi Jinping 2012 profile on BBC Radio Four

 
1953 births
Living people
 
20th-century atheists
20th-century Chinese politicians
21st-century Chinese politicians
Chinese atheists
Chinese Communist Party politicians from Beijing
Chinese expatriates in the United States
Chinese male writers
Chinese Marxists
Chinese nationalists
Communist writers
Critics of religions
Delegates to the 16th National Congress of the Chinese Communist Party
Delegates to the 17th National Congress of the Chinese Communist Party
Delegates to the 18th National Congress of the Chinese Communist Party
Delegates to the 19th National Congress of the Chinese Communist Party
Delegates to the 20th National Congress of the Chinese Communist Party
Delegates to the 9th National People's Congress
Delegates to the 10th National People's Congress
Delegates to the 11th National People's Congress
Delegates to the 12th National People's Congress
Delegates to the 13th National People's Congress
Delegates to the 14th National People's Congress
Foreign recipients of the Nishan-e-Pakistan
General Secretaries and Chairmen of the Chinese Communist Party
Governors of Fujian
Governors of Zhejiang
Members of the 16th Central Committee of the Chinese Communist Party
Members of the 17th Politburo Standing Committee of the Chinese Communist Party
Members of the 18th Politburo Standing Committee of the Chinese Communist Party
Members of the 19th Politburo Standing Committee of the Chinese Communist Party
Members of the 20th Politburo Standing Committee of the Chinese Communist Party
People's Republic of China philosophers
People's Republic of China politicians from Beijing
Persecution of Christians
Philosophers from Beijing
Presidents of the People's Republic of China
Recipients of Grand Collar of the State of Palestine
Recipients of the Olympic Order
Recipients of the Order of the Liberator General San Martin
Secretaries of the Communist Party Shanghai Committee
Sent-down youths
Tsinghua University alumni
Vice presidents of the People's Republic of China
Victims of the Cultural Revolution